Hugh Emrys Griffith (30 May 1912 – 14 May 1980) was a Welsh film, stage, and television actor. He is best remembered for his role in the film Ben-Hur (1959), which earned him critical acclaim and an Academy Award for Best Supporting Actor. Some of his other notable credits include Exodus (1960), Mutiny on the Bounty (1962), Tom Jones (1963), and Oliver! (1968).

Early life
Griffith was born in Marian-glas, Anglesey, Wales, the youngest son of Mary and William Griffith. He was educated at Llangefni County School and attempted to gain entrance to university, but failed the English examination. He was then urged to make a career in banking, becoming a bank clerk and transferring to London to be closer to acting opportunities. 

Just as he was making progress and gained admission to the Royal Academy of Dramatic Arts, he had to suspend his plans in order to join the British Army, serving for six years with the Royal Welch Fusiliers in India and the Burma Campaign during the Second World War. He resumed his acting career in 1946.

Career
Between 1946 and 1976, Griffith won acclaim for many stage roles, in particular for his portrayals of Falstaff, Lear and Prospero. Griffith performed on both sides of the Atlantic, taking leading roles in London, New York City and Stratford. In 1952, he starred in the Broadway adaption of Legend of Lovers, alongside fellow Welsh actor Richard Burton. 

In 1958, he was back in New York, this time taking a lead role in the opening production of Look Homeward, Angel, alongside Anthony Perkins. Both he and Perkins were nominated for the Tony Award for Best Actor in a Play.

Griffith began his film career in British films during the late 1940s, and by the 1950s was also working in Hollywood. He won the Academy Award for Best Supporting Actor for his role in Ben-Hur (1959), and was nominated for his performance in Tom Jones (1963). In 1968, he appeared as the magistrate in Oliver!. His later career was often blighted by his chronic alcoholism. 

He played the funeral director Caradog Lloyd-Evans in the 1978 comedy Grand Slam. While visibly unwell at the time of shooting (years of alcohol abuse had clearly taken their toll), Griffith's portrayal received widespread acclaim and helped the movie attain cult status.

On television, he had major roles in Quatermass II (1955), a miniseries adaptation of A. J. Cronin's The Citadel (1960) and Clochemerle (1972).

Honours
He received an honorary degree from the University of Wales, Bangor, in 1965.

Death
Griffith, after being unwell for about a year, died in 1980 at his home in Kensington, London, two weeks before his 68th birthday.

Filmography

References

External links

1912 births
1980 deaths
Alumni of RADA
Best Supporting Actor Academy Award winners
British Army personnel of World War II
Royal Welch Fusiliers soldiers
Actors from Anglesey
Welsh male film actors
Welsh male stage actors
Welsh male television actors
People educated at Ysgol Gyfun Llangefni
20th-century Welsh male actors
Golders Green Crematorium